Cory Buckner is an American architect. Buckner's focus has been on restoration architecture. She received a B.F.A. from the Chouinard Art Institute and a M.Arch. from the University of California, Los Angeles.

Buckner is noted for her architectural and restoration projects in the Crestwood Hills section of Los Angeles.[1][2][3]

Working with her husband, Nick Roberts, they both restored a home that was purchased in Crestwood Hills, but after restoring the house, they both led a preservation movement in the neighborhood. This was a part of a housing cooperative called Mutual Housing Association. Fifteen of the 30 remaining houses are considered Historic/Cultural Monuments in Los Angeles.

In 2002, she was awarded the L.A. Preservation Award, “For the inspiring effort to protect and restore the original Mutual Housing Association homes in Crestwood Hills, preserving important examples of Southern California Modernism, and enhancing the sense of community in a unique neighborhood.” 

Los Angeles Magazine named Buckner one of "6 Women who Changed The Face of L.A. Architecture."[4] She is the recipient of the 2002 Los Angeles Conservancy Award.[3]

Further reading

Books

Buckner, Cory. A. Quincy Jones. Vol. 1, Phaidon Press, 2002.

Buckner, Cory. Crestwood Hills: the Chronicle of a Modern Utopia. Angel City Press, 2015.

Buckner, Cory, and Frederic P. Lyman. The Lyman House and the Work of Frederic P. Lyman: Drawing and Building. Crestwood Hills Press, 2017.

Articles

https://www.thevalueofarchitecture.com/architect/cory-buckner-architects/ 

https://www.midcenturyhome.com/interview-architect-cory-buckner-mid-century-houses-expert/ 

https://la.curbed.com/2011/3/29/10475286/cory-buckners-artsy-brentwood-residence-in-crestwood-hills-1

See also 
 List of California women architects

References

21st-century American architects
20th-century American architects
Living people
California women architects
Year of birth missing (living people)
20th-century American women
21st-century American women
Chouinard Art Institute alumni